Gisborne ( "Great standing place of Kiwa") is a city in northeastern New Zealand and the largest settlement in the Gisborne District (or Gisborne Region). It has a population of  The district council has its headquarters in Whataupoko, in the central city.

The settlement was originally known as Turanga and renamed Gisborne in 1870 in honour of New Zealand Colonial Secretary William Gisborne.

Early history

First arrivals
The Gisborne region has been settled for over 700 years. For centuries the region has been inhabited by the tribes of Te Whanau-a-Kai, Ngaariki Kaiputahi, Te Aitanga-a-Mahaki Rongowhakaata, Ngāi Tāmanuhiri and Te Aitanga-a-Hauiti. Their people descend from the voyagers of the Te Ikaroa-a-Rauru, Horouta and Tākitimu waka.

East Coast oral traditions offer differing versions of Gisborne's establishment by Māori. One legend recounts that in the 1300s, the great navigator Kiwa landed at the Turanganui River first on the waka Tākitimu after voyaging to the region from Hawaiki and that Pāoa, Captain of the waka Horouta, followed later. An alternative legend recounts that Kiwa waited so long for the Horouta canoe to arrive that he called its final landing place Tūranganui-a-Kiwa (The long waiting place of Kiwa).

However, a more popular version of events is that Horouta preceded Takitimu. In 1931, Sir Āpirana Ngata stated that Horouta was the main canoe that brought the people to the East Coast and that Ngāti Porou always regarded Takitimu as "an unimportant canoe". Māori historian Rongowhakaata Halbert affirmed this account, stating that Paoa's crew on the Horouta were the first inhabitants of the East Coast after migrating from Ahuahu or Great Mercury Island. Paoa gave his name to various places across the region, most notably the Waipāoa River (Wai-o-Pāoa).

During the 14th century, Māori tribes built fishing villages close to the sea and built pā on nearby hilltops.

Captain Cook landing

Gisborne's Kaiti Beach is the place where British navigator Captain James Cook made his first landing in New Zealand upon the Endeavour. Cook had earlier set off from Plymouth, England in August 1768 on a mission bound for Tahiti. Once he had concluded his duties in Tahiti, Cook continued south to look for a large landmass or continent, before heading west. Young Nick's Head was thought to be the first piece of New Zealand land sighted by Cook's party, and so named because it was first observed by cabin boy Nicholas Young on 6 October 1769.

On 9 October, Cook came ashore on the eastern bank of the Turanganui River, accompanied by a party of men. Their arrival was marred by misunderstanding and resulted in the death and wounding of nine Māori over four days.
It was also on the banks of the Turanganui River that first the township of Turanga, then the city of Gisborne, grew as European traders and whalers began to settle in the river and port area.

The landing site was commemorated by a monument in 1906, on the 137th anniversary of Cook's arrival. In 1964 the Gisborne committee of the New Zealand Historic Places Trust registered the land around the monument as a historic reserve, and in 1990 it was designated a National Historic Reserve and put under the care of the Department of Conservation.

In 2019 a memorial was erected by Ngāti Oneone on Titirangi, a local hill, to honour Te Maro who was one of the first casualties of the arrival of the ship Endeavour.

European settlement and town growth
Starting in the early 1830s, traders such as Captain John Harris and Captain George E. Read set up the first trading stations along the Turanganui river and are attributed to the founding of the town. Over the next 30 years, many more European traders and missionaries migrated to the region. In 1868 the government bought 300 hectares of land for a town site. The town was laid out in 1870 and the name changed from Turanga to Gisborne, after the then colonial secretary, and to avoid confusion with Tauranga. In 1872, Gisborne's first public school was opened and its first newspaper, the Poverty Bay Standard was established. A town council was formed in 1877.

Marae 
Te Poho-o-Rawiri and Te Kuri a Tuatai marae are located in the city suburbs.

Geography

Gisborne is a coastal city located on the east cape of New Zealand's North Island. It sits at the south end of the Gisborne District and also within Poverty Bay. The Poverty Bay Flats encompass Gisborne city as well as surrounding areas Mākaraka, Matawhero and Ormond where vineyards and farms are prominent. Gisborne is flat towards the shoreline, but forested and hilly inland.

Gisborne boasts a large stretch of coastline encompassing the Waikanae and Midway, Kaiti, Sponge Bay, Wainui and Makorori white sand beaches, which are popular for swimming and surfing.

Sometimes referred to as the 'City of Rivers', Gisborne sits at the convergence of the Waimata, Taruheru and Turanganui rivers. At only 1200 meters long, Turanganui is the shortest river in New Zealand.

Kaiti Hill (Titirangi), which sits directly above Cook's landing site, provides expansive views over the city and wider Poverty Bay. Many archaeological sites have been identified on Titirangi, including burial grounds, terraces, and middens. Titirangi Pā sits near the summit.

In the wider area surrounding Gisborne are two arboreta, Eastwoodhill, the National Arboretum of New Zealand at Ngatapa which spans over 130 hectares, and the smaller 50 hectare Hackfalls Arboretum at Tiniroto.

Up until Samoa and Tokelau's dateline shift in December 2011, Gisborne claimed to be the first city on Earth to see the sun rise each day. However, this is now only accurate in New Zealand's summer months. Sunrise in Gisborne ranges from 5:36 am in early December to 7:26 am in late June.

Climate
The region is sheltered by high country to the west. Gisborne enjoys a temperate oceanic climate (Cfb - Köppen climate classification) with warm summers and cool winters, temperatures rarely drop below 0 °C (32 °F) and occasionally rise above 30 °C (86 °F) with a yearly average of 2,200 sunshine hours. The annual rainfall varies from about 1000 mm near the coast to over 2500 mm in higher inland country. According to the NIWA dataset for 1981–2010 normals, Gisborne narrowly edged several other cities to have the warmest summer maxima of official stations. Winters are slightly cooler than more northerly areas, rendering that over the course of the calendar year, Gisborne is not the warmest station of the country. Even summertime mean temperatures are lower than northerly areas in spite of the highs due to the cooler nights. In spite of this, yearly mean temperatures are still some way above average for New Zealand as a whole.

Economy

The harbour was host to many ships in the past and had developed as a river port to provide a more secure location for shipping compared with the open roadstead of Poverty Bay which can be exposed to southerly swells. A meat works was sited beside the harbour and meat and wool were shipped from here. Now the harbour is the home of many smaller fishing boats as well as ships loading logs for export.

The city maintains a rural charm and is a popular holiday spot. Local industries include agriculture, horticulture, farming and forestry. Wine production is also valuable to the local economy.

Lifestyle

Art and culture

The Tairāwhiti Tamararo Regionals are an annual regional haka competition held in Gisborne in memory of Karaitiana Tamararo.

Gisborne is host to Rhythm & Vines, an annual 3-day music festival held over the New Year at Waiohika Estate. In 2012 and 2013, Rhythm and Vines made skinny dipping world record attempts.

The Lowe Street Museum was the first museum in Gisborne, located in the Lowe Street Municipal Offices. In 1955 the collection of Māori artefacts of William Lysner were put in his former residence, Lysner House, which was sold to the city for a nominal sum. It is now known as the Tairāwhiti Museum.

Since 2019 the Te Tairāwhiti Arts Festival is an annual event in the region with many events taking place in Gisborne.

Sport

 In rugby union Gisborne is home to Poverty Bay Rugby Football Union, who play in the Heartland Championship. The city is also home to several clubs who compete in the Poverty Bay competition - Horouta Sports Club, High School Old Boys (HSOB) Sports Club, Old Boys Marist (OBM) RFC, Pirates RFC, Waikohu Sports Club, and Young Māori Party (YMP) RFC. There are several other clubs in the wider Gisborne Region.
 In rugby league, Gisborne Taraiwhiti have historically represented Gisborne in national competitions. Gisborne is currently represented in the National Competition by the Waicoa Bay Stallions.
 In cricket, Gisborne is home to the Poverty Bay cricket team, who compete in the Hawke Cup. Poverty Bay is also a district association of the Northern Districts Cricket Association. First-class matches are sometimes held at Harry Barker Reserve. Clubs in the city include High School Old Boys (HSOB) Cricket Club and OBR Cricket Club.
 In football, Gisborne Thistle AFC, Gisborne Marist AFC, Gisborne United AFC, Gisborne Bohemians FC, and Riverina AFC compete in competitions organised by the Central Football Federation. The now-defunct Gisborne City AFC won the Chatham Cup in 1987.
 Netball in Gisborne is organised by the Gisborne Netball Centre. Netball teams in Gisborne are often associated with rugby or football clubs. Clubs include Horouta, High School Old Girls (HSOG), Old Boys Marist (OBM), Young Māori Party (YMP), and Gisborne Thistle.
 A number of other sports, including golf, basketball, rowing, hockey, tennis, and squash are catered to in Gisborne.

Demographics
The Gisborne urban area had a usual resident population of 34,527 at the 2018 New Zealand census, an increase of 3,294 people (10.5%) since the 2013 census, and an increase of 3,228 people (10.3%) since the 2006 census. There were 16,623 males and 17,907 females, giving a sex ratio of 0.93 males per female. Of the total population, 8,229 people (23.8%) were aged up to 15 years, 6,603 (19.1%) were 15 to 29, 14,184 (41.1%) were 30 to 64, and 5,511 (16.0%) were 65 or older.

In terms of ethnicity, 58.8% of the population identified as European (Pākehā), 51.6% as Māori, 5.3% as Pacific peoples, 3.5% as Asian, and 1.3% as other ethnicities (totals add to more than 100% since people could identify with multiple ethnicities).

Gisborne had an unemployment rate of 9.4% of people 15 years and over, compared to 7.4% nationally. The median annual income of all people 15 years and over was $24,400, compared to $28,500 nationally. Of those, 41.9% earned under $20,000, compared to 38.2% nationally, while 19.6% earned over $50,000, compared to 26.7% nationally.

Gisborne has the smallest percentage of population born overseas at 9.7% compared to 25.2% for New Zealand as a whole. The highest of these are British totalling 1,335 or 3.1% of the population. Furthermore, 73.0% of the population could speak in one language only, 16.2% in two languages and 1.1% in three or more languages.

Education

Gisborne City has four main high (secondary) schools: Gisborne Boys' High, Gisborne Girls' High, Lytton High and Campion College. Campion College is a Catholic co-educational school.

Transport

Air
Gisborne Airport serves as the domestic airport for the Gisborne Region. Regular flights between Auckland and Wellington are serviced by Air New Zealand under the Link brand, while a smaller airline called Air Napier provides services to Napier and Wairoa. For 25 years Sunair operated from Gisborne to Hamilton, Rotorua, Napier, Whakatane, Tauranga, Palmerston North, Paraparaumu and Wellington but those services were eventually suspended after 25 years.

Highways
 State Highway 2 connects Gisborne to Tauranga via Ōpōtiki and Whakatāne to the northwest, and to Napier and the rest of Hawke's Bay via Wairoa to the south. SH 2 travels towards Gisborne from the northwest from Te Karaka, a settlement approximately 31 km northwest of Gisborne. SH 2 passes through Makaraka, a suburb on the outer fringes of Gisborne. It then crosses the Waipaoa River and makes its way south through Manutuke and Wharerata before it enters the Hawke's Bay Region towards Nūhaka, Wairoa, and eventually on to Napier.

 State Highway 35 (part of the Pacific Coast Highway network) begins at a junction west of Gisborne with SH 2 just before SH 2 crosses the Waipaoa River on its way south to Manutuke. SH 35 borders Gisborne Airport to the south and enters Gisborne city on the southwestern fringes. It makes its way through the city out to the east, and continues up the coast connecting Gisborne to the East Cape.

Public transport 
Public transport is poorly developed in Gisborne, with only 0.2% of trips made by bus in 2013/14. This compares with 2.3% nationally, which itself is amongst the lowest proportions in the world. Go Bus is contracted to the council to run 22 services a day on 6 routes Monday to Friday, using 2 buses. From 1913 to 1929 Gisborne had battery-powered trams. Since then public transport has declined to about a fifth of the usage then. In 1930 the municipal buses travelled , and carried 28,531 passengers in 2 weeks. In 2012/13 the city buses carried about 78,000 passengers in 52 weeks, at a cost of about $120,000 a year, with about another $85,000 from fares.

Rail
Gisborne is the northern terminus of the Palmerston North - Gisborne Line railway, which opened in 1942 and mothballed (track kept in place but all services cancelled) in 2012. The permanent way has since suffered storm damage including bridge collapses and the line is believed unlikely to re-open for economic reasons. Prior to this, an isolated section of line operated from Gisborne to Moutohora – intended to be part of a line to Auckland via Rotorua, and later part of the East Coast Main Trunk Railway line. This connection was never completed and the Moutohora Branch line closed in 1959.

Rail passenger services were provided between Gisborne and Wellington until 1988, when the Endeavour express was cancelled north of Napier. Today, only the Gisborne City Vintage Railway operates limited heritage train rides out of Gisborne.

Port
In February 2018 the first grants from the Provincial Growth Fund included $2.3 million for the Gisborne port.

Suburbs

 Awapuni
 Elgin
 Gaddums Hill
 Ilminster
 Inner Kaiti
 Kaiti
 Makaraka
 Manutuke
 Mangapapa
 Makorori
 Riverdale
 Riverside
 Riverview
 Sponge Bay
 Tamarau
 Te Hapara
 Te Wharau
 Victoria
 Waikanae
 Waikirikiri
 Wainui Beach
 Whataupoko

In popular culture
Gisborne City was the setting of the 2014 drama film The Dark Horse, a biographical film starring Cliff Curtis about the late speed-chess champion, Genesis Potini. The film was shot in Gisborne and Auckland in the winter of 2013.

In March 2016, Gisborne hosted the premiere of Mahana, a New Zealand film set in Patutahi and Manutuke, and based on Witi Ihimaera's semi-autobiographical novel Bulibasha: King Of The Gypsies.

Sister cities
Gisborne has four sister cities, a sister port, and five friendly cities.

  Mahina, French Polynesia
  Nonoichi, Ishikawa, Japan
  Palm Desert, California, United States
  Rizhao, Shandong, China

Sister port
  Gamagōri, Aichi, Japan

Friendly cities
  Cassino, Italy
  Shire of Macedon Ranges, Victoria, Australia
  Valverde del Majano, Spain
  Wenchang, Hainan, China
  Whitby, England, United Kingdom

See also
 List of people from Gisborne, New Zealand

References

External links

Gisborne District Council official website
Tourism Eastland 
Historic Poverty Bay and the East Coast, N.I., N.Z., (1949) Joseph Angus Mackay

 
Populated places in the Gisborne District
Port cities in New Zealand
Surfing locations in New Zealand
Populated coastal places in New Zealand